Hills and mountains named Pierce, some of them after Franklin Pierce (1804–1869), 14th president of the United States:

 Pierce Pond Mountain, Maine
 Pierce Peak (Alaska)
 Pierce Peak (Antarctica) (named after psychiatrist Chester Pierce)
 Pierce Peak (New Mexico)
 Pierce Mountain (Arizona)
 Pierce Mountain (Arkansas)
 Pierce Mountain (Kentucky)
 Pierce Mountain (Virginia)
 Pierce Mountain (Washington)
 Pierce Hill (Somerset County, Maine)
 Pierce Hill (Waldo County, Maine)
 Pierce Hill (Norfolk County, Massachusetts)
 Pierce Hill (Worcester County, Massachusetts)
 Pierce Hill (Broome County, New York)
 Pierce Hill (Cattaraugus County, New York)
 Pierce Hill (Vermont)
 Pierce Hill (Washington)
 Mount Pierce (New Hampshire)
 Mount Pierce (California)
 Pierces Hill, Alabama